The Holy Family is a 1518 painting of the Holy Family (Jesus, Mary and Joseph), Saint Elisabeth, an infant John the Baptist and two angels. It is signed by Raphael, but most of the work was delegated to his workshop assistants. It was commissioned by Pope Leo X as a gift to Claude, wife of Francis I of France, hence its name. It is now in the Louvre.

See also
List of paintings by Raphael

Notes

References

External links
wga.hu

Paintings by Raphael
Paintings in the Louvre by Italian artists
1518 paintings
Paintings depicting John the Baptist
Raphael
Angels in art